This list is of heritage registers, inventories of cultural properties, natural and man-made, tangible and intangible, movable and immovable, that are deemed to be of sufficient heritage value to be separately identified and recorded. In many instances the pages linked below have as their primary focus the registered assets rather than the registers themselves. Where a particular article or set of articles on a foreign-language Wikipedia provides fuller coverage, a link is provided.

International

World Heritage Sites (see Lists of World Heritage Sites) – UNESCO, advised by the International Council on Monuments and Sites
Representative list of the Intangible Cultural Heritage of Humanity (UNESCO)
Memory of the World Programme (UNESCO)
Globally Important Agricultural Heritage Systems (GIAHS) – Food and Agriculture Organization
UNESCO Biosphere Reserve

 European Heritage Label (EHL) are European sites which are considered milestones in the creation of Europe. At the end of 2019 there are 48 sites designed with the European Heritage Label

 Historic Sites and Monuments in Antarctica protected under the Antarctic Treaty System

 Turkic Culture and Heritage Foundation

 Arab League Educational, Cultural and Scientific Organization

 Caribbean Heritage Organization

Afghanistan
: Society for the Preservation of Afghan Cultural Heritage

Albania
: List of Religious Cultural Monuments of Albania
National Centre of Cultural Property Inventory

Algeria
: List of cultural assets of Algeria

Andorra
: Bé d'interès cultural, as maintained by Patrimoni Cultural = Cultural Heritage of Andorra;  Llista de monuments d'Andorra

Angola
: Património Histórico-Cultural Nacional

Argentina
: National Historic Monuments of Argentina;  Monument historique national (Argentine)

Armenia
: State Heritage of National Register (Armenia)

Australia
: Heritage registers in Australia
Federal registers
Australian National Heritage List
Commonwealth National Heritage List
National Trust of Australia
Overseas places of historic significance to Australia
Register of the National Estate (defunct register)

State and territory registers
New South Wales State Heritage Register
Northern Territory Heritage Register
Queensland Heritage Register
South Australian Heritage Register
Tasmanian Heritage Register
Victorian Heritage Register
Western Australia State Register of Heritage Places

State national trusts
 National Trust of Queensland

Online database of all registers
 The National Heritage Database is a searchable database which includes:
places in the World Heritage List
places in the Australian National Heritage List
places in the Commonwealth National Heritage list
places in the Register of the National Estate (non-statutory archive)
places in the List of Overseas Places of Historic Significance to Australia
places under consideration, or that may have been considered for, any one of these lists.

Austria 
: Denkmalgeschütztes Objekt, as maintained by the Bundesdenkmalamt

Azerbaijan
: State Register of Intangible Cultural Heritage Samples of Azerbaijan
 List of monuments of Azerbaijan

Bahamas
: Bahamas National Trust

Bahrain
: Bahrain Authority for Culture and Antiquities

Bangladesh
: Cultural Heritage of Bangladesh and National Heritage Foundation of Bangladesh

Barbados
: Barbados National Trust

Belarus
: Cultural Properties of Belarus

Belgium 
: National Heritage Site (Belgium);  Lijsten van cultureel erfgoed

Benin
:  Liste du patrimoine mondial au Bénin

Bhutan
 : Bhutan Foundation

Bolivia
: Bolivian cultural heritage

Bosnia and Herzegovina
: List of National Monuments of Bosnia and Herzegovina, as maintained by the Commission to preserve national monuments of Bosnia and Herzegovina;

Botswana
: Sites and monuments in Botswana

Brazil
: List of National Historic Heritage of Brazil, as maintained by the National Institute of Historic and Artistic Heritage;  Listas de patrimônio do Brasil

Bulgaria
: National Institute of Immovable Cultural Heritage

Cambodia
: Law on the Protection of Cultural Heritage

Cameroon
 : Liste de monuments du Cameroun

Canada
: The Canadian Register of Historic Places, while it confers no historic designation or protection itself, endeavours to list all federal, provincial, territorial and local sites.

Federal
National Historic Sites of Canada

Provincial
 
Sites owned and run by the provincial government as a functioning historic site or museum are known as Provincial Historic Sites and Provincial Historic Areas.  Buildings and sites owned by private citizens and companies or other levels or branches of government may gain one of two levels of historic designation, "Registered Historic Resource" or "Provincial Historic Resource". Historic designation in Alberta is governed by the Historic Resources Act. The province also lists buildings deemed historically significant by municipal governments on the Alberta Register of Historic Places, which is also part of the larger Canadian Register of Historic Places although this does not imply provincial or federal government status or protection.  The Alberta Main Street Program helps to preserve historic buildings in the downtowns of smaller communities.  The Heritage Survey Program is a survey of 80,000 historic buildings in Alberta, with no protective status.

Places and areas designated under the Heritage Conservation Act (the New Brunswick Register of Historic Places acts as a register of sites designated under the Act)

Heritage Foundation of Newfoundland and Labrador designated properties

Properties designated under the Ontario Heritage Act
 
Répertoire du patrimoine culturel du Québec

Local
Heritage buildings of Vancouver
City of Toronto Heritage Property Inventory
 Register of Historic Resources in Edmonton

Chile
: National Monuments of Chile, as maintained by the Consejo de Monumentos Nacionales

China
: Major Historical and Cultural Site Protected at the National Level (全国重点文物保护单位), designated by State Administration of Cultural Heritage

Hangzhou
Sites Protected at the City Level of Hangzhou are districts, artifacts or buildings legally declared to be "protected". According to the "Regularations of historic districts and historic buildings in Hangzhou" effectivated from 1 January 2005, historic buildings are those artifacts or districts that have lasted more than 50 years, and of significant values for history, science, and art study. In Hangzhou, declaring a historic house requires consulting the urban planning administration bureau, and the real estate administration bureau.

As of 31 June 2011, there are 287 declared historic houses in Hangzhou, proclaimed as 5 batches. In the near future, it is going to issue the sixth batch which includes 51 historic houses.
List of first batch of declared historic buildings in Hangzhou
List of second batch of declared historic buildings in Hangzhou
List of third batch of declared historic buildings in Hangzhou
List of fourth batch of declared historic buildings in Hangzhou
List of fifth batch of declared historic buildings in Hangzhou

Harbin
Harbin Urban and Rural Planning Bureau
Preserved Buildings

Colombia
: National Monuments of Colombia;  Monumentos Nacionales de Colombia

Comoros 
: National Committee of Intangible Cultural Heritage (Comoros)

Republic of the Congo 
: Protection of Cultural Heritage in the Republic of the Congo

Costa Rica 
  Monumento Nacional de Costa Rica

Croatia 
: Register of Protected Natural Values of the Republic of Croatia
Register of Cultural Goods of the Republic of Croatia

Cuba
: Consejo Nacional de Patrimonio Cultural

Cyprus
: Heritage Gazetteer of Cyprus

Czech Republic
:  Seznam národních kulturních památek České republiky,  Liste der Nationalen Kulturdenkmale Tschechiens, as featuring on MonumNet

Democratic Republic of the Congo
: National Inventory of the Cultural Heritage of the Democratic Republic of the Congo

Denmark
: National Register of Sites and Monuments, as maintained by the Danish Agency for Culture

Djibouti
: List of monuments of Djibouti

Dominica
: Dominica Cultural Division

Dominican Republic
: Cultural heritage sites in the Dominican Republic

East Timor
: Intangible Cultural Heritage of East Timor

Ecuador
: Monuments of Ecuador

Egypt
: List of Historic Monuments in Cairo as recorded by Comité de Conservation des Monuments de l'Art Arabe, the predecessor of the Supreme Council of Antiquities.

El Salvador
: Cultural heritage sites in El Salvador

Estonia
It has been described as one of the most successful and more complete heritage registers.
 Estonian inventory of intangible cultural heritage, maintained by the Estonian Folk Culture Centre.

Eswatini
: National Monuments of Swaziland, as maintained by the Swaziland National Trust Commission

Ethiopia
: Ethio-SPaRE: Cultural Heritage of Christian Ethiopia

Fiji
: National Trust of Fiji and National Sites and Places of Heritage Significance

Finland
: There are two registers confirmed at the state level:
, compiled by the Finnish Heritage Agency
, compiled by the Finnish Environment Institute

France
: Monument historique
Mérimée List
List of historic monuments of 1840.  See Liste des monuments historiques de 1840, at Fr. Wikipedia

Gabon
: List of monuments of Gabon

Gambia
: HerMaP Gambia

Georgia
: The National Agency for Cultural Heritage Preservation of Georgia is a government agency responsible for preservation, protection, research and promotion of cultural heritage of the country. The Agency maintains three registers of Georgia's cultural heritage:
 Immovable Cultural Monuments
Immovable Cultural Monuments of National Significance
 Movable Cultural Monuments
 Intangible cultural heritage of Georgia

Germany
: The Deutsche Stiftung Denkmalschutz is an organization which facilitates public awareness and protection of heritage sites listed. These lists are kept on the website denkmalliste.org, which has all German heritage registers ("Denkmallisten") gathered together in one portal.
Kulturdenkmal
Bayerische Denkmalliste

Ghana
: Ghana's material cultural heritage

Greece
: Intangible Cultural Heritage of Greece

Grenada
: Grenada National Trust

Guam
: Chamorro heritage sites (Guam)

Guatemala
: Historical monuments of Guatemala

Guinea
: List of monuments of Guinea

Guinea-Bissau
: List of monuments of Guinea-Bissau

Guyana
: National Trust of Guyana

Haiti
: (in French) Culture et Patrimoine, as maintained by the Gouverment d'Haïti

 National Register of Cultural Heritage (Haiti)

Honduras
: Patrimonio Cultural de la Nación (Honduras)

Hong Kong
:
Monuments
Declared monuments of Hong Kong
Historic Buildings
List of Grade I historic buildings in Hong Kong
List of Grade II historic buildings in Hong Kong
List of Grade III historic buildings in Hong Kong

Hungary
: The Forster Gyula Nemzeti Örökségvédelmi és Vagyongazdálkodási Központ was an organization which facilitates public awareness and protection of heritage sites listed up to 2016.12.31. (There are partial list from 8 county of Hungary). From 2017.01.01. the cultural heritage management is in the competence the Prime Minister’s Office and the Hungarian Academy of Arts.
Műemlékem is a non official list maintained by a non-governmental organization.

Iceland
: Cultural Heritage Agency of Iceland

India
: National Archives of India, a government agency run by Ministry of Culture
National level
 Monuments of National Importance of India: designated by the Archeological Survey of India and maintained by the union government of India
 National Geological Monuments of India: designated by the Geological Survey of India and maintained by the union government of India

State level
 State Protected Monuments of India: designated by the Archeological Survey of India and maintained by the state governments of India

Indonesia
: Cultural Properties of Indonesia

Iran
: Iran National Heritage List is a register of nationally significant monuments, places, buildings, archaeological sites, events, etc., officially registered under the National Heritage Preservation Act of 1930. According to Article 1 of this law, "All the industrial monuments and buildings that were built up to the end of the Zand dynasty in the country of Iran, including movable and immovable in accordance with Article 13 of this law, can be considered as national heritage of Iran and under the protection and supervision of the state."

Iraq
: Iraq Heritage

Ireland
: In the Republic of Ireland, some registers are maintained by sections of the Department of Arts, Heritage and the Gaeltacht (The National Monuments Service and National Inventory of Architectural Heritage). Others are maintained by the "planning authority": the local council for the county, city, borough, or town where the monument or building is sited.

Israel
: List of National Heritage Sites of Israel; cf. Council for Conservation of Heritage Sites in Israel

Italy
: Catalogo Generale dei Beni Culturali under creation; catalogo regionale dei beni culturali already maintained by each region:
 : WebGIS del patrimonio culturale dell'Emilia Romagna
 : Sistema Informativo dei Beni Culturali della Regione Lombardia (SIRBeC)

Ivory Coast
: (in French) Liste des monuments historiques de la Côte d'Ivoire

Jamaica
: Jamaica National Heritage Trust, established in 1958. The organisation maintains a list of National Heritage Sites in Jamaica.

Japan
: Cultural Properties of Japan, as maintained by the Agency for Cultural Affairs; see also National Treasures of Japan

Jordan
: Department of Antiquities (Jordan)

Kazakhstan
: Cultural Heritage (Kazakhstan)

Kenya
: List of sites and monuments in Kenya

Kiribati
: Cultural Heritage of Kiribati

Korea (North)
: National Treasures of North Korea, Cultural assets of North Korea

Korea (South)
: National Treasures of South Korea, Historic Sites of South Korea, Important Intangible Cultural Properties of Korea, etc., as maintained by Cultural Heritage Administration

Kosovo
: Cultural heritage of Kosovo

Kuwait
: National Council for Culture, Arts and Literature
 List of monuments of Kuwait

Laos
: Cultural Heritage Management (Laos)

Latvia
Contains information about 7371 monuments of culture. The list is maintained by State Inspection for Heritage Protection, a government agency.

Full list is available at valsts aizsargājamo kultūras pieminekļu saraksts (in Latvian).

Lebanon
: (in French) Monument historique (Liban)

Lesotho
: Lesotho Heritage Network

Liberia
: Heritage Liberia

Libya
: Heritage Gazetteer of Libya

Liechtenstein
: Liechtenstein National Archives.

Kulturgüterregister (in German).

Lithuania
: 

The list is available here.

Luxembourg

 "Buildings and objects classified as national monuments or listed on supplementary inventory".

The list is maintained by Service des sites et monuments nationaux, a Government agency. The latest version is available here.

See Lëscht vun de klasséierte Monumenter on lb-wiki and :commons:Category:Cultural heritage monuments in Luxembourg.

Madagascar
 : Liste des sites et monuments culturels de Madagascar

Malaysia
: National Heritage Register (Malaysia)

Malta
: National Inventory of the Cultural Property of the Maltese Islands

Marshall Islands
: [[Cultural Heritage Legislation in the 
Republic of the Marshall Islands]]

Martinique
: Cultural heritage of Martinique

Mauritania
  Liste des monuments nationaux de la Mauritanie

Mauritius
: Ministry of Arts and Cultural Heritage (Mauritius)

Mexico
: National Monuments of Mexico

Moldova
: National Register of Intangible Cultural Heritage (Moldova)

Mongolia
: Cultural Heritage Program (Mongolia)

Morocco
: Historic Monuments and Sites of Morocco

Mozambique
: Cultural Properties of Mozambique

Myanmar
: 
Yangon City Heritage List, 
Myanmar National Environmental Policy

Namibia
: National Monuments, as maintained by the National Heritage Council of Namibia;  Liste der Nationalen Denkmäler in Namibia

Nauru
: Nauru National Heritage Register

Nepal
: List of monuments in Nepal

Netherlands
: List of Rijksmonuments (Monumentenregister van de Rijksdienst voor het cultureel erfgoed)

New Caledonia
: Patrimoine natural et culturel de la Nouvelle-Caledonia.

New Zealand
 Rarangi Taonga: The Register of Historic Places, Historic Areas, Wahi Tapu and Wahi Tapu Areas (administered by New Zealand Historic Places Trust.)

Nicaragua
: List of monuments of Nicaragua

Niger
: Niger Heritage

Nigeria
: National Cultural Policy (Nigeria)

North Macedonia
:  Patrimoine culturel de la République de Macédoine

Norway
: (in Norwegian) Lister over kulturminner i Norge; Immateriell kulturarv; Norway Heritage Community; Cultural Heritage Act

Pakistan
: There are several organizations that take care of historic and heritage sites in Pakistan.
 Department of Archaeology and Museums (Ministry of Heritage and National Integration (Pakistan))
National Archives of Pakistan
Directorate of Archaeology & Museums, Sindh
Sindh Building Control Authority
 Directorate General of Archaeology, Punjab
 Directorate of Archaeology & Museums, of Khyber Pakhtunkhwa.
  Directorate General of Archaeology, Balochistan
 List of cultural heritage sites in Pakistan

Palau
: Bureau of Cultural and Historic Preservation, as maintained by Title 19, Chapter 1 of the Palau National Code

Palestine
: Palestinian Heritage Foundation

Panama
  Monumentos de Panamá

Papua New Guinea
: National Cultural Commission (Papua New Guinea)

Paraguay
: El Inventario Nacional de Bienes Culturales, under creation by the Dirección de Catalogación del Patrimonio Cultural

Peru
: Patrimonio Cultural de la Nación (Perú)

Philippines
: Cultural Properties of the Philippines

Poland
: A list of objects of cultural heritage in Poland (zabytki) is maintained by the National Heritage Board of Poland. It is primarily composed of objects in the register of objects of cultural heritage (rejestr zabytków), objects with the status of Historical Monument (pomnik historii), objects classified as a cultural park (park kulturowy).

Portugal
: National Monuments, as maintained by IGESPAR;  :pt:Lista de património edificado em Portugal

Puerto Rico
: (in Spanish) Patrimonio Histórico Edificado, as maintained by the Institute of Puerto Rican Culture (Instituto de Cultura Puertorriqueña) which functions as the territory State Historic Preservation Office, in association to the United States National Register of Historic Places.

Qatar
: Qatar Foundation

Romania
: National Register of Historic Monuments in Romania – The list, created in 2004–2005, contains historical monuments entered in the National Cultural Heritage of Romania. It is maintained by the Romanian National Institute of Historical Monuments, part of the Ministry of Culture and National Patrimony in Romania.

Russia
: Russian cultural heritage register;  Списки объектов культурного наследия России; Historical Cities of Russia

Rwanda
: List of cultural heritage monuments in Rwanda

Saint Kitts and Nevis
: St. Christopher National Trust

Saint Lucia
: Saint Lucia National Trust

Samoa
: 
Documentation of Samoan Archaeological and Built Heritage Places and Associated Oral Traditions
National Heritage Board (Samoa)

San Marino
: Institute for the Conservation and Valorization of Cultural Heritage

Saudi Arabia
: National Antiquities Register, as maintained by the Heritage Commission.
 Saudi Heritage Preservation Society

Senegal
: Sites et Monuments historiques;  Liste des monuments et sites historiques au Sénégal
 La Direction du Patrimoine Culturel (Senegal)

Serbia

Cultural Heritage of Serbia

The register is divided into twelve categories:

Seychelles
: Seychelles Heritage Foundation

Sierra Leone
: National Monuments of Sierra Leone, as maintained by the Ancient Monuments and Relics Commission

Singapore
: National Monuments of Singapore

Slovakia
: Cultural Heritage Monuments of Slovakia;  Liste (Kulturdenkmale in der Slowakei)

Slovenia
: Register of Cultural Heritage of Slovenia; (in Slovenia) Register kulturne dediščine Slovenije

The register consists of three parts:

 Register nepremične kulturne dediščine (the Register of Immovable Cultural Heritage), it is subdivided into Cultural Monuments of National Importance and Cultural Monuments of Local Importance.
 Register premične kulturne dediščine (the Register of Movable Cultural Heritage)
 Register nesnovne kulturne dediščine (the Register of Intangible Cultural Heritage)

Solomon Islands
: Protected Areas Act (Solomon Islands) and Culture Division (Solomon Islands)

Somalia
: Cultural Heritage Database (Somalia)

South Africa
: South African Heritage Resources Agency
List of heritage sites in South Africa

Spain
: Monument (Spain) (Monumento histórico or Bien de Interés Cultural)
 Lists of Bienes de Interés Cultural

Sri Lanka
: Archaeological Heritage Management (Sri Lanka)

Sudan
: Digital Cultural Heritage Register (Sudan)

Suriname
: Suriname Heritage Guide

Sweden
: Listed buildings in Sweden, as maintained by the Swedish National Heritage Board; see also  Kulturmärkning i Sverige

Switzerland
: Swiss Inventory of Cultural Property. National register of some 8,300 objects of international, national, regional and local significance. Managed by the Federal Office for Civil Protection (see its website).
There are also cantonal registers of cultural heritage sites.
See also :Category:Heritage registers in Switzerland.

Syria
: Syrian Heritage Initiative

Taiwan
: Bureau of Cultural Heritage, which keeps a list on their website. 
 List of national monuments of Taiwan

Tanzania
: National Historic Sites in Tanzania

Thailand
: see Cultural heritage conservation in Thailand

Togo
: (in French) Liste nationale d'inventaire des biens culturels du Togo

Tonga
: Tonga Heritage Society

Trinidad and Tobago
: National Trust of Trinidad and Tobago

Tunisia
: (in French) Liste des monuments classés de Tunisie

Turkey
: Immovable Cultural and Natural Properties (see )

Turkmenistan
: National Register of Cultural Heritage Sites (Turkmenistan)

Tuvalu
: Tuvalu National Cultural Policy

Uganda
: National Cultural Sites of Uganda

Ukraine
: State Register of Immovable Monuments of Ukraine

United Arab Emirates
: Cultural heritage of the United Arab Emirates

United Kingdom
 
Heritage, culture, planning and conservation are devolved issues in the United Kingdom, and are dealt with by the governments of the constituent countries. England, which does not have its own devolved government, is covered by an agency of the United Kingdom government.

See also Historic Environment Record (HERs) and Sites and Monuments Record (SMRs) maintained usually at a local government level (archaeological trusts in Wales).

 The Schedule of Ancient Monuments (follows on pre-devolution 1979 Act of Parliament)
 : English Heritage, an executive agency of the Department for Digital, Culture, Media and Sport
 The National Heritage List for England (launched May 2011). Contains list of all scheduled monuments, listed buildings, registered parks and gardens, historic wrecks and registered historic battlefields in England
English Heritage Archive: formerly the National Monuments Record (England)
Register of Parks and Gardens
 Registered Battlefields (UK)
 Protection of Wrecks Act 1973
 Heritage at Risk Register
: Both scheduled and listed buildings are registered and otherwise handled by the Department for Communities. (Until 16 May 2016, these roles were held by the Northern Ireland Environment Agency, an executive agency within the Department of the Environment.) Northern Ireland also has an additional register of state care monuments.
Registers of Archaeology and Monuments
Listed Buildings
Historic Environment Record of Northern Ireland
:
Historic Environment Scotland, an executive agency of the Scottish Executive Education Department
Inventory of Historic Battlefields
Inventory of Gardens and Designed Landscapes in Scotland
Royal Commission on the Ancient and Historical Monuments of Scotland (RCAHMS) – executive non-departmental public body
National Monuments Record of Scotland (NMRS): the archive formerly known as the Scottish National Buildings Record
Canmore: a database that is part of the NMRS
: 
Cadw, an agency of the Welsh Assembly Government
Scheduled monuments in Wales
Cadw/ICOMOS Register of Parks and Gardens of Special Historic Interest in Wales
Royal Commission on the Ancient and Historical Monuments of Wales, a Welsh Government sponsored body 
National Monuments Record of Wales (NMRW)
Coflein: the online database for the NMRW

Other Associated States or Territories 
Although not part of the United Kingdom itself, these are self-governing states or territories with strong ties to the British Crown or the United Kingdom, often putting defence and foreign relations in to their hands while handling all other matters internally. All have the British Monarch as their head of state.

Crown Dependancies 
The Crown Dependancies are three states which are possessions of the Crown, geographically in the British Isles or the Channel Islands.

 : National Trust of Guernsey
 : States Assembly Listed buildings
 : Manx National Heritage

Overseas Territories 
The British Overseas Territories (also known as the "United Kingdom Overseas Territories") are the last remnants of the British Empire. There are fourteen total, however, not all of these have heritage registers.

 : Bermuda National Trust
 : National Trust for the Cayman Islands
 : Ministry for Heritage together with the Gibraltar Heritage Trust
 : Historic Buildings Committee
 Listed buildings in the Falkland Islands

United States

In the United States, a site is only listed on the National Register of Historic Places on recommendation from the state historic preservation offices in the relevant state. Some states maintain their own state-level historic registers, although in some U.S. states all properties on the state register duplicate the National Register listing. The National Register listing in itself confers no protection to a historic property but may qualify the site for matching grants for historic restoration. Local historic designations in many municipalities provide some limited protection against demolition of historic landmarks.

National
 national monuments are a separate register from the National Register of Historic Places
National Historic Landmarks
National Natural Landmarks
American Presbyterian/Reformed Historic Sites Registry

State-level and local-level

Alabama Register of Landmarks and Heritage
 
California Historical Landmarks
California Register of Historical Resources
California Points of Historical Interest
List of Berkeley Landmarks, Structures of Merit, and Historic Districts
Los Angeles Historic-Cultural Monuments
San Francisco Designated Landmarks
 
List of historic buildings and districts designated by the City of Atlanta

Hawai'i Register of Historic Places
 
Chicago Landmarks
 
Michigan Historic Sites

Mississippi Landmarks

Designated historic properties in Amherst, New York listed at the town level
City of Buffalo landmarks and historic districts (designated by the Buffalo Preservation Board)
New York City Landmarks (designated by the New York City Landmarks Preservation Commission)
Town of Oyster Bay Landmarks
Local landmarks in Williamsville, New York

Philadelphia Register of Historic Places
List of City of Pittsburgh historic designations

 List of National Historic Landmarks in Texas
 National Register of Historic Places listings in Texas
 List of Recorded Texas Historic Landmarks (RTHL)
 Texas Historical Commission Historical Markers

Virginia Historic Landmarks Register
 
Washington State Heritage Register

Uruguay
: (in Spanish) Monumento Histórico Nacional

Uzbekistan
: List of monuments of Uzbekistan

Vanuatu
: Vanuatu National Heritage Registry

Venezuela
: Inventario de monumentos, as maintained by the Instituto de Patrimonio Cultural

Vietnam
: Friends of Vietnam Heritage

Yemen
: Ancient Yemen Digital Atlas

Zambia
: Monuments and Historic Sites of Zambia

Zimbabwe
: National Monuments of Zimbabwe

References

External links
 Manual on Systems of Inventorying Immovable Cultural Property (UNESCO)

 
Lists by country